Internal elections of the Israeli trade union centre Histadrut were held in 1965. 862,000 Histadrut members were eligible to vote, out of whom 77.69% took part in the polling.

Results

References

Histadrut
Histadrut
Trade union elections